Guyana competed at the 1972 Summer Olympics in Munich, West Germany. Three competitors, all men, took part in four events in two sports.

Boxing

Men's Light Middleweight (– 71 kg)
Reginald Ford
 First Round — Bye
 Second Round — Lost to Alan Minter (GBR), KO-2

Cycling

One cyclist represented Guyana in 1972.

Sprint
 Neville Hunte

1000m time trial
 Neville Hunte
 Final — 1:10.48 (→ 22nd place)

References

External links
Official Olympic Reports

Nations at the 1972 Summer Olympics
1972 Summer Olympics
1972 in Guyana